Paul Jabara, also known as  Paul Frederick Jabara, (January 31, 1948 – September 29, 1992) was an American actor, singer, and songwriter. He was born to a Lebanese family inBrooklyn, New York. He wrote Donna Summer's Oscar-winning "Last Dance" from Thank God It's Friday (1978) as well as "No More Tears (Enough Is Enough)" her international hit duet with Barbra Streisand. He also cowrote The Weather Girls iconic hit "It's Raining Men" (with Paul Shaffer).

Actor
Jabara was in the original cast of the stage musicals Hair and Jesus Christ Superstar. He took over the role of Frank-N-Furter in the Los Angeles Production of The Rocky Horror Show when Tim Curry left the production to film the movie version in England. He appeared in John Schlesinger's 1969 film Midnight Cowboy, as a hippie handing out pills ("Up or Down?") at the counterculture party, and in Schlesinger's 1975 film The Day of the Locust, where he sang a cover of the Marlene Dietrich song "Hot Voo-Doo" in drag. In the 1978 film Thank God It's Friday he played the role of Carl, the lovelorn and nearsighted disco goer, and he also contributed as a singer on two tracks on the original soundtrack album. In 1981 Jabara starred in another John Schlesinger film, the comedy Honky Tonk Freeway, as truck driver/songwriter T. J. Tupus, hauling lions and a rhino.

Songwriter and singer
Jabara wrote the book, music, lyrics and starred in the aborted Broadway musical Rachael Lily Rosenbloom (And Don't You Ever Forget It), which played the Broadhurst Theatre in New York City in 1973. It closed in previews prior to its official opening and was never reviewed by the press. No recording was made of the score, which featured both Jabara's trademark disco music and traditional Broadway-style numbers.

In 1976, Jabara contributed a song to the 20th Century Fox motion picture sound track of Mother, Jugs & Speed, starring Bill Cosby, Raquel Welch and Harvey Keitel.  The upbeat, disco-flavored "Dance", both written and sung by Jabara, which was popular in clubs featuring high energy dance music.

Jabara released his debut album Shut Out in 1977. Jabara's solo albums on the disco label Casablanca Records include three duets with Donna Summer: "Shut Out" (1977), "Something's Missing (In My Life)" (1978) and "Never Lose Your Sense of Humor" (1979).

Donna Summer performed his song "Last Dance" for the 1978 film Thank God It's Friday winning Jabara the Grammy Award for Best R&B Song, the Academy Award for Best Original Song and the Golden Globe Award for Best Original Song.

In 1979, with Bruce Roberts, he co-wrote Barbra Streisand's top 3 hit "The Main Event/Fight", and the pair wrote their biggest success with the international smash "No More Tears (Enough Is Enough)", recorded as a duet by Streisand and Donna Summer.

In 1981, he wrote  "No Jinx" for Bette Midler as the theme tune to her movie Jinxed!. Diana Ross scored a 1982 UK top hit with his song "Work That Body".

In 1982, Two Tons O' Fun, renaming themselves as The Weather Girls, agreed to record his song "It's Raining Men", previously rejected by Summer, Streisand, Cher and Ross. The song became an international hit, topping the US Dance chart and peaking at #2 in the UK. That song was re-recorded in 1998 by RuPaul and Martha Wash as "It's Raining Men...The Sequel" and later by Geri Halliwell in 2001 when it reached #1 on the UK Singles Chart.

The original Weather Girls' recording of "It's Raining Men" was included on Jabara's 1983 album Paul Jabara & Friends, which included one of the early recordings by then 19-year-old Whitney Houston on "Eternal Love" (previously recorded by Stephanie Mills) as well as a Jabara/Diana Ross co-write "Ladies Hot Line." Other songs Jabara had covered by major artists include "Hope" by Billy Preston (1981), "Two Lovers" by Julio Iglesias (1984) and "This Girl's Back in Town" by Raquel Welch (1987).

In 1986, Jabara released his final album, the concept musical De La Noche: The True Story – A Poperetta, featuring guest vocals from Leata Galloway, Diva Gray and Pattie Brooks.

In 2005, a workshop of a musical titled Last Dance played New York City. It was a musical assembled from Jabara's well known disco songs and told the story of a modern-day teenager who goes back in time to spend one night at Studio 54.

Death
On September 29, 1992, Jabara died from complications from AIDS in Los Angeles, California at the age of 44. He is buried at Green-Wood Cemetery.

On June 14, 2014, Jabara was featured in the first gay-themed tour of Green-Wood Cemetery.

Discography

Studio albums
 Shut Out (Casablanca Records, 1977)
 Keeping Time (Casablanca, 1978)
 The Third Album (Casablanca, 1979)
 Paul Jabara & Friends, with The Weather Girls, Leata Galloway, Whitney Houston (Columbia/CBS, 1983)
 De La Noche: The True Story - A Poperetta with Leata Galloway (Warner Bros., 1986)

Soundtracks and compilations
  Original Soundtrack - Thank God It's Friday 
 Greatest Hits... and Misses (Casablanca/PolyGram, 1989)
 The Casablanca Records Story (PolyGram, 1994)
 Mother, Jugs and Speed soundtrack

Singles
 "One Man Ain't Enough" (1975)
 "Dance" (1976)
 "Yankee Doodle Dandy" (1976)
 "Shut Out" duet with Donna Summer (1977)
 "Slow Dancing" (1977)
 "Dancin' (Lift Your Spirits Higher)" (1978)
 "Pleasure Island" (1978)
 "Take Good Care of My Baby" / "What's a Girl to Do", Paul Jabara & Pattie Brooks (1978)
 "Trapped in a Stairway" (1978)
 "Disco Queen" (1978)
 "Saturday Matinee" (1978)
 "Never Lose Your Sense of Humor", duet with Donna Summer (1979)
 "Disco Wedding" (1979)
 "Honeymoon (In Puerto Rico)" (1979)
 "Disco Divorce" (1979)
 "Ocho Rios" (1986)
 "This Girl's Back in Town" (1986)

Filmography
 Midnight Cowboy (1969) - The Party #2
 Medea (1969) - Pelias
 The Out-of-Towners (1970) - First Hippie (uncredited)
 Necropolis (1970)
 Been Down So Long It Looks Like Up to Me (1971) - Heap
 The Ski Bum (1971) - Rocco
 Blu Gang e vissero per sempre felici e ammazzati (1973) - Teddy Fog
 The Lords of Flatbush (1974) - Crazy Cohen
 The Day of the Locust (1975) - Nightclub Entertainer
 Peeper (1975) - Janitor
 Thank God It's Friday (1978) - Carl
 Honky Tonk Freeway (1981) - T.J. Tupus
 Legal Eagles (1986) - Taxi Driver
 Les Patterson Saves the World (1987) - Leroy
 Slaves of New York (1989) - Derelict
 9 1/2 Ninjas! (1991) - Mr. Ninja, voice
 Light Sleeper (1992) - Eddie

References

External links

 

1948 births
1992 deaths
20th-century American male musicians
American male songwriters
American people of Lebanese descent
Burials at Green-Wood Cemetery
Grammy Award winners
Donna Summer
LGBT composers
American LGBT actors
American LGBT songwriters
LGBT people from New York (state)
Best Original Song Academy Award-winning songwriters
Golden Globe Award-winning musicians
AIDS-related deaths in California
American disco singers